This is a list of properties and districts in Fayette County, Georgia that are listed on the National Register of Historic Places (NRHP).

Current listings

|}

References

Fayette
Buildings and structures in Fayette County, Georgia